Ceratinia iolaia is a species of butterfly of the family Nymphalidae. It is found in Colombia.

Subspecies
 Ceratinia iolaia iolaia (Colombia)
 Ceratinia iolaia coneniens Bryk, 1937 (Colombia)
 Ceratinia iolaia rehni Fox, 1941 (Colombia)

References

Butterflies described in 1856
Ithomiini
Nymphalidae of South America